The orange-crested flycatcher (Myiophobus phoenicomitra) is a species of bird in the family Tyrannidae. It is found in Colombia, Ecuador, and Peru. Its natural habitat is subtropical or tropical moist montane forests.

References

orange-crested flycatcher
Birds of the Colombian Andes
Birds of the Ecuadorian Andes
Birds of the Peruvian Andes
orange-crested flycatcher
orange-crested flycatcher
Taxonomy articles created by Polbot